K2-146 b is a Neptune-like exoplanet discovered in 2018 that orbits a M-type star and is found in the constellation Cancer. It was discovered by the Kepler Space Telescope. It orbits around one low-mass star. It is also the only exoplanet to orbit around K2-146. Namely, it orbits closer to its sun than Mercury does, and that is being 97% closer to its sun than Earth is to ours, it orbits very rapidly and well inside what would be regarded as the 'habitable zone’.

References 

Exoplanets discovered by K2
Exoplanets discovered in 2018
Cancer (constellation)
Transiting exoplanets